Elections to the Shetland Islands Council were held on 7 May 1974 as part of Scottish local elections.  This was the first election for the all-purpose Shetland Islands Council, as established by the Local Government (Scotland) Act 1973, combining the Lerwick Town Council and the Zetland County Council.  The Council operated as a shadow authority until May 1975, when it assumed full responsibilities for local government in Shetland.  11 seats were uncontested.

Aggregate results

Ward results

By-elections since 1974

References

1974
1974 Scottish local elections